SH9 may refer to:

 Colorado State Highway 9
 State Highway 9 (Tamil Nadu)
 Oklahoma State Highway 9
 Texas State Highway 9
 Steve Howard
 The model code of the 3rd generation Subaru Forester

See also

 List of highways numbered 9